Alain Dufaut (born 2 January 1944 in Apt, Vaucluse) was a member of the Senate of France, representing the Vaucluse department, from 1 October 1987 to 30 September 2014.  He is a member of the Union for a Popular Movement.

References 
Page on the Senate website

1944 births
Living people
People from Vaucluse
Rally for the Republic politicians
Union for a Popular Movement politicians
Gaullism, a way forward for France
French Senators of the Fifth Republic
Senators of Vaucluse